Conner Ives (born 1996) is an American fashion designer.
He was raised in Bedford, New York by a dentist mother and pastor and psychotherapist father.

He is a graduate of Central St. Martin's. While still at CSM he dressed model Adwoa Aboah for the 2021 Met Gala from which he gained the notice of Rihanna who hired him to help create her first Fenty collection.

He also put out his own first collection while still in school.  He is especially known for the t-shirt dresses he was hired by the London fashion boutique Browns to design for them.

Ives work is included in the 2021 exhibition "In America: A Lexicon of Fashion" (part one of a two part exhibition) at the Anna Wintour Costume Center at New York City's Metropolitan Museum of Art including a piece from his 2021 collection. In the show he is heralded for his stance on sustainability.  At the gala opening for the exhibition his design was worn by model Natalia Bryant.

References

1996 births
American fashion designers
Living people
Alumni of Central Saint Martins